The Last Minute is a 2001 British-American urban gothic film, written and directed by Stephen Norrington.

It shows a struggling man hitting bottom and finding light in unexpected places, and trying a huge alternative as the solution to his problems while giving up the life he recently found.

Review

References

External links

The Last Minute at Rotten Tomatoes

British satirical films
British independent films
Films directed by Stephen Norrington
American satirical films
American independent films
2000s English-language films
2000s American films
2000s British films